François Jeanne (13 November 1943 – 30 January 2011) was a French fencer. He competed at the 1968, 1972 and 1976 Summer Olympics.

References

External links
 

1943 births
2011 deaths
French male épée fencers
Olympic fencers of France
Fencers at the 1968 Summer Olympics
Fencers at the 1972 Summer Olympics
Fencers at the 1976 Summer Olympics
20th-century French people